Raymond Williams (1 May 1931 – September 2015) was a Welsh professional footballer who played as a right-back. He made appearances in the English Football League with Wrexham.

References

1931 births
2015 deaths
Welsh footballers
Association football defenders
Holyhead Town F.C. players
Wrexham A.F.C. players
English Football League players